Michael Sorrell (born November 11, 1966) is the president of Paul Quinn College, serving since 2007.

Personal life and education 
Sorrell grew up in Chicago, the son of a social worker and the owner of a South Side barbecue restaurant. Sorrell attended St. Ignatius College Prep. He earned a bachelor's degree from Oberlin College, and a master's degree (M.A. in Public Policy) and law degree from Duke University. His doctorate in education is from the University of Pennsylvania.

Career 

Sorrell worked for numerous Dallas law firms after earning his law degree. Sorrell also worked as a special assistant in the executive office of the president during the Clinton administration, and has also worked as a public affairs consultant. After the president of Paul Quinn College left the college in 2001, Sorrell sought the position, but instead earned a spot on the college's board. Sorrell became the president of Paul Quinn College in 2007. Under Sorrell, Paul Quinn College founded the We Over Me Farm on the college's former football field. The farm is part of Sorrell's larger goal of creating a "new urban college model" and addressing what Sorrell sees as a food desert in the region around Paul Quinn College.

Sorrell was also part of a potential ownership group that put in a bid for the Memphis Grizzlies. Sorrell was also involved with the sale of the Dallas Mavericks to Mark Cuban.

See also 
 Paul Quinn College

References

External links 
 Twitter account

1966 births
Living people
Oberlin College alumni
Duke University School of Law alumni
University of Pennsylvania Graduate School of Education alumni
Paul Quinn College
Heads of universities and colleges in the United States
St. Ignatius College Prep alumni